Konsum is a name used by several consumer cooperatives, including:
Coop Konsum, part of Kooperativa Förbundet in Sweden
Konsum, a state-controlled retailer in the former German Democratic Republic
Konsum Österreich, a former retail co-operative and part-owner of BAWAG in Austria